Sambava Airport is an airport in Sambava, Sava Region, Madagascar .

Airlines and destinations

References

External links

Airports in Madagascar
Sava Region